Events in the year 1962 in Germany.

Incumbents
President – Heinrich Lübke 
Chancellor –  Konrad Adenauer

Events 
16-17 February - North Sea flood of 1962
2 February - Germany in the Eurovision Song Contest 1962
28 February – Oberhausen Manifesto
22 June – 3 July 12th Berlin International Film Festival
8 October – Spiegel affair begins, when an article in Der Spiegel questions the adequacy of Germany's defence capability.
14 December – The Fifth Adenauer cabinet, led by Konrad Adenauer, is sworn in.

Births
5 January – Ralf Meister, German Lutheran theologian, former General Superintendent (regional bishop) of Berlin, and Landesbischof of the Evangelical-Lutheran Church of Hanover
9 January – André Wohllebe, German canoeist (died 2014)
19 January – Monika Grütters, German politician
31 January – Frank Wieneke, German judoka
8 February – Martin Wuttke, German actor
13 February – Christiane Weber, German fencer
25 February – Birgit Fischer, German kayaker
4 March – Stephan Reimertz, German historian and author
9 March – Rolf Saalfrank, shot putter
10 March – Sepp Daxenberger, politician (died 2010)
12 March – Andreas Köpke, footballer
24 March – Irina Meszynski, German discus thrower
26 March – Susanne Daubner, German television presenter
1 April – Stefanie Tücking, German radio and television presenter (died 2018)
24 April – Heike Kemmer, equestrian 
28 April – Susanne Klatten, German business woman
29 April – Stephan Burger, German bishop of Roman Catholic Church
18 May – Sandra, German singer
21 May – Uwe Rahn, German football player
31 May – Sebastian Koch, German actor
3 June – Dagmar Neubauer, German sprinter
10 June – Ralf Schumann, German sport shooter
22 June – Campino, German singer
24 June – Christine Neubauer, German actress
9 July – Jan Degenhardt, German lawyer and folk-singer
15 July – Jens Bullerjahn, German engineer and politician (died 2022)
21 July – Gabi Bauer, German journalist
28 July – Torsten Gütschow, German football player
9 August – Annegret Kramp-Karrenbauer, German politician
23 August – Jürgen Tonkel, German actor
9 October – Durs Grünbein, German poet 
25 October – Martin Haase, German linguist
30 October – Stefan Kuntz, German football player
1 November – Ulf Timmermann, German athlete
6 November – Georg Uecker, German actor
28 November – Andreas Behm, German weightlifter
30 November – Heinrich Deichmann, German entrepreneur
1 December – Detlev Buck, German actor, film producer and screenwriter
5 December – Marion Kracht, German actress
14 December – Bela B., German singer and musician
31 December – Katy Karrenbauer, German actress

Deaths
1 January – Hans von Salmuth, German general (born 1888)
7 February – Clara Nordström, Swedish-born German writer and translator (born 1886)
8 March – Hans Felber, Wehrmacht general and Knight's Cross recipient (born 1889)
11 May – Hans Luther, German politician, Chancellor of Germany (born 1879)
19 May – Gabriele Münter, German painter (born 1877)
26 May – Karl Rapp, German founder and owner of the Rapp Motorenwerke GmbH in Munich.(born 1882)
1 June – Adolf Eichmann, German Nazi SS-Obersturmbannführer (lieutenant colonel) (born 1906)
15 June – Wolrad, Prince of Schaumburg-Lippe, German nobleman (born 1887)
18 June – Friederich-Karl Burckhardt, German World War I flying ace (born 1889)
9 August – Hermann Hesse, German writer (born 1877)
20 August – Kurt Schumacher, German politician (born 1895)
1 September – Hans-Jürgen von Arnim, German general (born 1889)
10 September – Rudolf Petersen, German politician (born 1878)
25 September – Herbert Koch, Germa narchaeologist (born 1880)
21 October – Karl Elmendorff, German conductor (born 1891)
14 November – Wilhelm Lachnit, German painter (born 1899)
13 December – Rudolf Wissell, German politician (born 1869)

See also
 1962 in German television

References

 
Years of the 20th century in Germany
1960s in Germany
Germany
Germany